Cecilioides petitiana is a species of air-breathing land snail, a pulmonate gastropod mollusk in the family Ferussaciidae.

This is a subterranean species.

Distribution 
 Slovakia

References

External links

Ferussaciidae
Gastropods described in 1862